The Guatemalan tyrannulet or paltry tyrannulet (Zimmerius vilissimus), is a very small passerine bird in the tyrant flycatcher family. It occurs in southern Mexico, Guatemala, El Salvador and southern Belize.

It was formerly considered to be conspecific with the mistletoe tyrannulet (Zimmerius parvus).

The Guatemalan tyrannulet is a common bird from the lowlands to  altitude, mainly in humid regions. It can be found in forests, second growth, pasture and plantations with trees, and shady gardens.

The nest is roughly spherical with a side entrance and made of mosses and lined with plant fibre. It may be built amongst mosses or dangling epiphyte roots, inside a large dead leaf or inside or below a yellow-olive flycatcher's pendant nest. It is constructed 2–15 m above the ground. The typical clutch is two rufous-marked dull white eggs. Incubation by the female is 14–15 days to hatching, with another 17 days to fledging.

The upperparts are olive-green other than a dull grey crown to the head and grey supercilia. The wings are blackish with yellow feather edging but no wing bars, and the longish tail is dusky. The throat and breast are off-white with grey streaking, the belly is white, and the flanks have a dull yellow-green cast. The long legs are blackish. The sexes are similar, but young birds have an olive crown, yellow-tinged supercilia and broader but paler wing bars. The call is a loud  and the dawn song is a plaintive .

The Guatemalan tyrannulet is an active bird, usually seen alone or in pairs high in trees. It eats mainly mistletoe, but also other berries and small insects, all taken in flight in short sallies from a perch.

References

Further reading

External links
Photo; Article Guatemalan Study area
"Paltry tyrannulet" photo gallery VIREO

Guatemalan tyrannulet
Birds of Mexico
Birds of Guatemala
Birds of Honduras
Birds of Nicaragua
Birds of Costa Rica
Birds of Panama
Guatemalan tyrannulet
Guatemalan tyrannulet
Guatemalan tyrannulet